Limbo (1920), Aldous Huxley's first collection of short fiction, consists of six short stories and a play.

"Farcical History of Richard Greenow"
"Happily Ever After"
"Eupompus Gave Splendour to Art by Numbers"
"Happy Families" (play)
"Cynthia"
"The Bookshop"
"The Death of Lully"

External links
 
 

1920 short story collections
Short story collections by Aldous Huxley